Eucithara eumerista is a small sea snail, a marine gastropod mollusk in the family Mangeliidae.

Description
The length of the shell attains 6 mm, its diameter 2.5 mm.

This is a pure white ovate species, very smooth white and shining. The shell contains 6 whorls, ventricose, roundly longitudinally costate. On the body whorl there are just below the sutures brown spots between the ribs in one transverse line, and also subpellucid linear marking.  The outer lip and columella are both much denticled. The sinus is not very deep or  conspicuous.

Distribution
This marine species occurs off New Caledonia, the Loyalty Islands and Queensland (Australia).

References

External links
  Tucker, J.K. 2004 Catalog of recent and fossil turrids (Mollusca: Gastropoda). Zootaxa 682:1-1295
 
  Hedley, C. 1922. A revision of the Australian Turridae. Records of the Australian Museum 13(6): 213-359, pls 42-56

eumerista
Gastropods described in 1896